Mohammed Jewel Rana (born 1 October 1972) is a retired Bangladeshi professional footballer who played as a centre back.

Career
Jewel captained the Bangladesh national football team during their 1999 SAF Games triumph. Jewel, began his career in the first division in 1988, he went on to win domestic league titles for Mohammedan SC, Muktijoddha Sangsad KC and Brothers Union. Jewel also played for Kolkata giants Mohun Bagan AC for 2 years. On 24 January 2009, he retired from professional football after captaining Mohammedan SC during the Dhaka Derby.

Jewel began his debut for the national team in 1989, only a year after his top-tier debut. On 18 March 1997, Jewel scored his first goal for Bangladesh against Taiwan during the 1998 World Cup qualifiers. During the qualifiers he also scored against Saudi Arabia, in a match which saw Bangladesh lose 4–1, even after putting up a good fight. Jewel was an integral part of the 1999 SAF Games winning Bangladesh squad, where he scored twice during the entirety of the tournament. He announced his retirement from the national team after their SAF triumph, however, played for Bangladesh on more time in 2001, against Bosnia and Herzegovina.

Personal life
On 22 April 2021, Jewels Ranas's father Manik Uddin Ahmed passed away at the age of 82.

Career statistics

International goals
Scores and results list Bangladesh's goal tally first

Honours
Mohammedan SC (Dhaka)
 Dhaka League: 2001–02
 Federation Cup: 2001–02

Brothers Union
Federation Cup: 2005

Bangladesh
 South Asian Games Gold medal: 1999

Awards and accolades
1996 − Sports Writers Association's Best Footballer Award.

References

Living people
1972 births
Footballers from Dhaka
Bangladeshi footballers
Bangladesh international footballers
Bangladesh youth international footballers
Association football defenders
Muktijoddha Sangsad KC players
Mohammedan SC (Dhaka) players
Brothers Union players
Bangladesh Football Premier League players
Bangladeshi expatriate footballers
Bangladeshi expatriate sportspeople in India
Mohun Bagan AC players
Calcutta Football League players
South Asian Games gold medalists for Bangladesh
South Asian Games medalists in football
Bangladeshi football managers
Bangladesh Football Premier League managers